The Austrian Mixed Doubles Curling Championship is the national championship of mixed doubles curling (one man and one woman) in Austria. It has been held annually since the 2008–2009 season. The championships are organized by the Austrian Curling Association.

List of champions and medallists
Team line-ups in order: female, male.

 "KCC" — Kitzbühel Curling Club

References

See also
Austrian Men's Curling Championship
Austrian Women's Curling Championship
Austrian Mixed Curling Championship
Austrian Junior Curling Championships

Curling competitions in Austria
National curling championships
Recurring sporting events established in 2008
2008 establishments in Austria
Annual sporting events in Austria
Mixed doubles curling